Alfred Cleave Hammond Button was the Dean of Dunedin from 1945 until 1956.

Button was educated at  Selwyn College, Otago and  ordained in 1913. After a curacy at St. Paul's Cathedral, Dunedin he was Priest in charge at Lawrence then Vicar of Waimea Plains. He then held further incumbencies at Caversham, Waikouaiti and Roslyn. He was Archdeacon of Central Otago from 1934 to 1945.

References

Deans of Dunedin
University of Otago alumni